Henrietta Catherine Knight (born 15 December 1946) is a retired  English Thoroughbred racehorse trainer. Knight is best known as a trainer of National Hunt racehorses.

She is the daughter of Major Hubert Guy Broughton Knight (1917–1993) and Hester Loyd. Her sister, Celia Elizabeth Knight (1949–2020), was married to Samuel Vestey, 3rd Baron Vestey. 

An Oxford graduate, Knight formerly worked as a teacher of biology and history before becoming a trainer. She was a prominent figure in the equestrian sport of eventing, finishing 12th at the Badminton Horse Trials in 1973, and becoming the chairperson of the British Olympic Games Horse Trials Selection Committee from 1984 to 1988. This period included the selection of the Silver medal-winning team for the Seoul Olympics.

Knight began training under rules in 1989 having previously trained over 100 winners on the amateur point-to-point circuit from 1984 to 1989. Her training base was a farm in West Lockinge, near Wantage in Oxfordshire.

Henrietta married former champion National Hunt jockey Terry Biddlecombe in 1995 and has no children. Biddlecombe died on 5 January 2014. 

Among her better known victories were training the triple Cheltenham Gold Cup winner Best Mate, and the Queen Mother Champion Chase winner Edredon Bleu. Both horses also won the King George VI Chase and were owned by Jim Lewis and his late wife Valerie. 

Among her other stable stars have been Calgary Bay who won the Dipper Chase at Cheltenham in January 2009, Somersby, who won the Grade 1 Victor Chandler Chase at Ascot in 2012 after impressing many in the top novice events at the Aintree and Cheltenham Festivals and Racing Demon, the winner of the Peterborough Chase at Huntingdon Racecourse in 2006 and 2007. 

Knight announced her retirement from training on 24 May 2012.

Henrietta Knight has authored four books thus far. BEST MATE Chasing Gold, and Best Mate: Triple Gold, NOT ENOUGH TIME - My life with Terry Biddlecombe and The Jumping Game.

Major wins

 Cheltenham Gold Cup - (3) - Best Mate (2002, 2003, 2004)
 Clarence House Chase - (1) - Somersby (2012)
 Clonmel Oil Chase - (1) - Edredon Bleu (2003)
 Dipper Novices' Chase - (1) - Calgary Bay (2009)
 Glenlivet Hurdle - (1) - Stompin (1996)
 Grand Annual Chase - (1) - Edredon Bleu (1998)
 King George VI Chase - (2) - Best Mate (2002), Edredon Bleu (2003)
 Lanzarote Hurdle - (1) - Heart (2000)
 Lexus Chase - (1) - Best Mate (2003)
 Mersey Novices' Hurdle - (1) - Best Mate (2000)
 Peterborough Chase - (8} - Edredon Bleu (1998, 1999, 2000, 2001), Best Mate (2002), Impek (2005), Racing Demon (2006, 2007) 
 Queen Mother Champion Chase - (1) - Edredon Bleu (2000)
 Scilly Isles Novices' Chase - (1) - Best Mate (2001)
 Stayers Hurdle - (1) - Karshi (1997)
 Sun Alliance Chase - (1) - Lord Noelie (2000)
 Victor Chandler Chase - (1) - Somersby (2012)

References
 

1946 births
Alumni of the University of Oxford
British racehorse trainers
Living people
People from Wantage